Jack Johnston may refer to:

 J. W. Johnston (1876–1946), Irish American stage and film actor
 Jack Johnston (footballer) (1887–1962), Australian rules footballer
 John Johnston (econometrician), known as Jack, British econometrician